Kyungpook National University Museum is an archaeological museum located in Buk District, Daegu, South Korea. The museum opened on 28 May 1995 on the thirteenth anniversary of opening of the university. The area of the exhibition hall is 13,824 m2.

References

External links 
 
 *https://web.archive.org/web/20120402114116/http://museum.knu.ac.kr/introduce/facility.html

Museums in Daegu
Museums established in 1995
University museums in South Korea
Buk District, Daegu
Archaeological museums in South Korea
Museum
1995 establishments in South Korea